The Rose of England is Child ballad 166 and Roud Folk Song Index 4001.  It is an account of Henry VII of England claiming the throne from Richard III of England, frequently allegorically.  It may be the oldest ballad on the Battle of Bosworth, and as old as 1485, but the earliest manuscript is from the mid-seventeenth century.

Synopsis

A lovely garden (England) had a rose tree, which produced a king over England, France, and Ireland.  A boar wrought havoc in the garden, but an eagle bore a rose away to safety.  The rose returned and asked the eagle, his father, for aid.  The eagle rejoiced.

Sir Rhys ap Thomas brought Wales to his support. The Earl of Richmond - as Henry VII was then known - won Shrewsbury with the aid of letters from Sir William Stanley. When Mitton, who had held the town against him, said that he knew no king but Richard and promised to serve him if he were named king, Henry pardoned him.  

The boar and the eagle must meet, which causes the old eagle to lament the danger.  The eagle fought, with the aid of the talbot, the unicorn, and the hart's head, and won, making the garden fresh and green again.

Commentary
Many of the allegorical statements refer to the shields of those involved.

The garden is England, and the rose tree the House of Lancaster, with the king being Henry V of England.  The boar is either the House of York, which claimed the throne in the person of Edward IV of England, or Richard III of England, who endangered the future Henry VII of England's life, causing his uncle Jasper Tudor to flee the country with him - or represents both.

External links
The Rose of England
"The Battle of Bosworth", with information on the ballad

Child Ballads
Year of song unknown